Abdul Hamid Miah is a Bangladeshi agriculturist and researcher at the Bangladesh Rice Research Institute. He received the Independence Day Award, the highest civilian honour in Bangladesh, in 2013 for his unique contribution to research and education.

Career 
Miah has served as the chairman of the Bangladesh Agricultural Research Council.

Miah is in research and training. He received the Independence Day Award in 2013 in recognition of his unique contribution.

References 

Living people
Bangladeshi agriculturalists
Recipients of the Independence Day Award
Year of birth missing (living people)